This article documents the timeline of transmission of COVID-19 during the pandemic in Belarus in 2022.

Timeline

January 2022

See also 
 COVID-19 pandemic in Belarus
 Timeline of the COVID-19 pandemic in Belarus (2020)
 Timeline of the COVID-19 pandemic in Belarus (2021)

References

Belarus